The Central District of Pol-e Dokhtar County is a district (bakhsh) in Pol-e Dokhtar County, Lorestan Province, Iran. At the 2006 census, its population was 50,596, in 11,102 families.  The District has one city: Pol-e Dokhtar. The District has four Rural Districts (dehestans): Jayedar Rural District, Jelogir Rural District, Malavi Rural District, and Miyankuh-e Gharbi Rural District.

References 

Districts of Lorestan Province
Pol-e Dokhtar County